Portrait Society of America is an art organization based in Tallahassee, Florida, United States. Established in 1998, the Portrait Society of America is a 501(C)3 registered charity was set to serve the purpose of an art education organization to foster the art of like portraiture, figurative art and Contemporary-Traditional Art through art programs and publications. The Portrait Society is dedicated to providing educational resources for everyone who has the curiosity for technical information, aesthetics in traditional art and history of portraiture and figurative art. The Portrait Society has more than 2,750 members around the globe.

The Portrait Society was established by Edward Jonas, Gordon Wetmore, and Tom Donahue as a national non-profit organization in 1998. The organization is governed by an executive board and advisory board in which Daniel Greene, James Gurney, Rhoda Sherbell, Burton Silverman and Mary Whyte are members of the board.

Competitions 
The Portrait Society of America hosts three competitions annually with The International Portrait Competition being the most prominent one.  After many rounds of selection, twenty finalists are selected to exhibit their original work at The Art of the Portrait conference for a final round of judging and the selection of the awards. The William F. Draper Grand Prize is the top award given by the organization.

William F. Draper Prize Winners

Gold medal recipients

References

Arts organizations based in Florida
Arts organizations established in 1998
Figurative art
Portrait art
1998 establishments in Florida
Organizations based in Tallahassee, Florida
501(c)(3) organizations